Oregon Ballot Measure 88 was a ballot measure in the U.S. state of Oregon in the 2014 midterm elections to determine whether or not to refer a "law creating a four-year driver's card, shorter than the usual eight years for a driver's license, for those who meet all other qualifications other than proof of legal presence in the United States". The measure was rejected.

The background for the referendum was a law SB 833 which would have allowed undocumented immigrants to get a driver's card which was passed by the Oregon Legislative Assembly and signed by Governor John Kitzhaber in 2013. An ad hoc group, Protect Oregon Driver Licenses, subsequently collected more than the 58,142 signatures which was required to trigger a citizens' veto referendum and the question was put on the ballot as Measure 88 in the 2014 general election.

The measure was supported by unions, business organizations and groups concerned with immigrant rights. In the election it was rejected by 66% of the voters while 34% supported it.

Results

See also
 Driver's license in the United States

References

Driving licences
2014 Oregon ballot measures